Dimethoconols are a class of silicone-based polymers similar to dimethicone in their chemical structure save that molecules of dimethiconol end with hydroxyl (-OH) groups. They are used in a wide range of cosmetic and personal care products such as suntan lotion and lipstick where it works as an emollient, a film-former, an antistatic agent and an anti-foaming agent, among other uses. Like other silicone-based liquids, it is not water soluble.

References

Siloxanes